Frederik Børm (born August 12, 1988) is a Danish handball player, who plays for the Norwegian team ØIF Arendal. Frederik Børm joined ØIF Arendal as part of their 2021-2022 season.

Career
Frederik Børm has played in a number of Danish handball clubs including Aarhus Håndbold, SønderjyskE, Skjern Håndbold, KIF Kolding, Nordsjælland Håndbold, Viborg HK, Bjerringbro-Silkeborg and Stoholm Håndbold. He has also played abroad first in France for Istres Provence Handball for the end of their 2020-2021 season and later for the Norwegian team ØIF Arendal from the 2021/2022 season.

References

1988 births
Living people
Danish male handball players
People from Randers
SønderjyskE Håndbold players
Sportspeople from the Central Denmark Region